Héctor Orlando Romero Rivas (born January 3, 1980) is a Venezuelan former professional basketball player.

Professional career 

 2000–2002:   Basket Bravos de Portuguesa
 2002–2004:   Basket Marinos de Oriente
 2004-2005: Haifa-Ramat Hasharon
 2005:   Basket Marinos de Anzoategui
 2005-2006: Haifa-Ramat Hasharon
 2006:   Basket Marinos de Anzoategui
 2006:   Basket Murcia
 2007:   Basket AE Larissa
 2007:   Basket Scafati
 2008:   Basket Siena
 2008–2009:   Basket Udine
 2009:   Basket Marinos de Anzoategui
 2009–2010: Basket Espartanos de Margarita
 2011:   Basket Indios de Mayaguez
 2012–2013:   Basket Trotamundos de Carabobo
 2014–2016:   Basket Bucaneros de La Guaira
 2017:   Basket Marinos de Anzoategui
 2020:   Basket Centauros de Portuguesa

National team career
Romero was also a member of the senior men's Venezuelan national basketball team, and he played at the 2002 FIBA World Championship.

References

External links 
Euroleague.net Profile
RealGM profile
New Orleans Privateers College Profile

1980 births
Living people
2002 FIBA World Championship players
A.E.L. 1964 B.C. players
Bucaneros de La Guaira players
CB Murcia players
Guaiqueríes de Margarita players
Independence Pirates men's basketball players
Indios de Mayagüez basketball players
Israeli Basketball Premier League players
Liga ACB players
Marinos B.B.C. players
Mens Sana Basket players
New Orleans Privateers men's basketball players
Olympia Larissa B.C. players
Pallalcesto Amatori Udine players
People from Barcelona, Venezuela
Power forwards (basketball)
Scafati Basket players
Trotamundos B.B.C. players
Venezuelan men's basketball players
Venezuelan expatriate basketball people in Greece
Venezuelan expatriate basketball people in Israel
Venezuelan expatriate basketball people in Italy
Venezuelan expatriate basketball people in Puerto Rico
Venezuelan expatriate basketball people in the United States